Marcu Beza (June 30, 1882 in Kleisoura, Ottoman Empire – May 6, 1949 in Bucharest, Romania) was a Romanian poet, writer, essayist, literary critique, publicist, folklorist, and diplomat of Aromanian origin.

Beza was elected a corresponding member of the Romanian Academy in 1923. He was an editor of the Aromanian newspaper Românul de la Pind.

Works

In English 
 Papers on the Romanian People and Literature, London, 1920;
 Paganism in Romanian Folklore, London, 1928;
 Lands of Many Religions. Palestine, Syria, Cyprus and Mount Sinai, London, 1934;
 Origin of the Roumanians, Worcester-London, 1941;
 The Roumanian Church, London, 1943;
 Heritage of Byzantium, London, 1947;
 Shakespeare in Roumania, London, 1931;
 Zidra. Gardana. The Dead Pool, London – New York, 1921;

In Romanian 
 De la noi, Bucharest, 1903;
 Graiu bun. Calendar aromânesc, Bucharest, 1909;
 Pe drumuri. Din viața aromânilor, Bucharest, 1914;
 Romantismul englez, Bucharest;
 O viață, București, 1921; ediția (Doda), London, 1925;
 Ruva. Între două lumi, Bucharest;
 Romanul englez contimporan, Bucharest, 1928;
 Din alte țări. Studii și impresii, Bucharest, 1933;
 Biblioteci mănăstirești la Muntele Athos, Bucharest, 1934;
 Urme românești în Răsăritul Ortodox, Bucharest, 1935;
 Calea destinului, Bucharest, 1938;
 Cartea cu amintiri, Bucharest, 1938;
 Din Anglia, însemnările unui literat, Iași;
 Vechi legături cu Anglia, Bucharest, 1938;
 Necunoscuta, Bucharest, 1939;
 Romantismul: romanul englez, îngrijită și introducere de Andi Bălu, Bucharest, 1999;
 Pe tărâmuri biblice, Bucharest, 2000.

References

External links 

 Avdhela Project – Library of Aromanian Culture: Marcu Beza. Vlahii la muntele Athos (digitized edition) (in Romanian language)
 Avdhela Project – Library of Aromanian Culture: Marcu Beza. Urme românești la Muntele Athos (digitized edition) (in Romanian language]
 The Romanian Cultural Institute: Plural. Culture and Civilization Art Recollections (21/2004) – Marcu Beza
 
 

1882 births
1949 deaths
Romanian poets
Aromanian poets
Aromanian editors
Romanian essayists
Romanian people of Aromanian descent
Corresponding members of the Romanian Academy
20th-century essayists